Brooloo is a rural town and locality in the Gympie Region, Queensland, Australia.

Geography 

Mary Valley Road enters the locality from the north-west (Imbil), passes through the town (in the north of the locality), and then exits to the south-east Kenilworth.

Brooloo railway station is an abandoned railway station on the now-closed  Mary Valley railway line.

History
The Bluff Provisional School opened in July 1907. On 1 January 1909 it became The Bluff State School. In May 1915 it was renamed Brooloo State School. It closed in 1970.

Brooloo Hall opened in 1915.

Brooloo Post Office opened by June 1915 (a receiving office had been open from March 1914). In 1922 the Brooloo Rail office was renamed Brooloo and replaced the previous office. It closed in 1972.

In the  Brooloo and the surrounding area had a population of 333.

In the  the locality of Brooloo had a population of 348 people.

Heritage listings 
Booloo has one heritage-listed site. It is Brooloo Hall at 3726 Mary Valley Road.

References

Further reading

External links 

 
Community website

Towns in Queensland
Localities in Queensland
Gympie Region